Sensuous is the fifth studio album by Japanese musician Cornelius. It was released on October 25, 2006 by Warner Music Japan. In the United States, the album was released on August 24, 2007 by Everloving Records. Sensuous peaked at number eight on the Oricon Albums Chart.

Critical reception

At Metacritic, which assigns a weighted average score out of 100 to reviews from mainstream critics, Sensuous received an average score of 70 based on 18 reviews, indicating "Generally favorable reviews".

Heather Phares of AllMusic called Sensuous "the finest expression of Cornelius' inimitable, playfully sophisticated musical language yet." Eric Harvey of Pitchfork wrote that the album "represents yet another step forward for Oyamada's unique headphone pop." He added, "It's not quite the departure that Point was from Fantasma, but it feels like a natural next step." Phull Hardeep of NME wrote that the album forewent any consistent theme for "a kaleidoscopic vision of experimental pop", adding that the album is "as befuddling as it is brilliant. Whether you dig it or not, the fact remains that there isn’t anyone – and never has been – making music like this guy." Christian Hoard of Rolling Stone commented that the album is "as gleefully weird" as Cornelius' previous work, citing "blips, glitches, warm acoustic instruments, plus snatches of melody." However, he criticised the lack of "tunes", writing that none of the material is hummable."

Track listing

Personnel
Credits are adapted from the album's liner notes.

 Keigo Oyamada – performance, production
 Yuko Araki – drums on "Fit Song"
 Eirik Glambek Bøe – vocals on "Omstart"
 Masumi Itō – photography
 Masakazu Kitayama – sleeve design
 Toyoaki Mishima – programming, recording
 Osamu Okada – photography
 Erlend Øye – vocals on "Omstart"
 Tohru Takayama – mastering, mixing

Charts

References

External links
 
 

2006 albums
Cornelius (musician) albums
Warner Music Japan albums
Everloving Records albums
Japanese-language albums
Experimental pop albums